The Ipswich Cardinals are an American Football team from the United Kingdom based in Ipswich, Suffolk. The team plays in the National Division South East Conference of BAFANL  – the second tier of the BAFA National Leagues.

Formation
Formed by Colin Cox, Mark LePorte and Don Laisure II in December 1985 at the Drunken Docker pub in Ipswich.

The club was formed by the players for the players, the club was owned by the players.

What's in a name?
The name comes from one of Ipswich's most famous sons, Cardinal Thomas Wolsey, who was Henry VIII's Lord chancellor (Chief advisor to the king). It is a clever play on the traditional name for some American sports teams, whereas theirs is generally a reference to the cardinal bird, their name is a tribute to a local historical figure.

The team's first training session was set for January 1986 at Gainsborough sports centre, Ipswich. Over 100 hopefuls turned up for tryouts – a lot of them went by the way, but there were a lot of hopefuls.
Don Laisure put the hopeful players through their paces along with Gary McCartney.
The committee approached Jack Garner who was the head coach of the Woodbridge high school team. He became the head coach until he was transferred to Holland – then, with the team coach-less, JJ Johnson was asked to help. JJ and Andy Melton took over the coaching roles, whilst Don Laisure stepped down and played instead.

All Time record

Rivalries
Ipswich has a long-standing rivalry with the city of Norwich in all sports and American football is no different. The Cardinals and the Devils games are always fiercely contested with both teams stepping up their games.

Other local rivalries are with Colchester Gladiators and the Essex Spartans.

Logo and uniforms

Logo
The Logo worn on the helmet was originally a cardinal's head, then the "Fighting Cardinal" (a representation of Cardinal Wolsey) which was designed by Mark Ayers, the first quarterback. Kevin Davies took it to an artist at the Port of Felixstowe to refine it.

Early Days
The original uniform first adopted by the Cardinals was a blue helmet with the cardinals head, white with blue and red numbers  home shirt, blue with white and red numbers away shirt, red pants.then red shirts white numbers away ,white with red numbers home shirts ,white pants . It is believed these colours were chosen as they matched the local football team Ipswich Town FC, it is not known however, when or why the team decided to abandon these colours in favour of their current ones.

Pre-2007
Later on the Cardinals switched to burgundy and gold for their helmets and home uniform, and all white for their away uniform. The helmets were gold with a central stripe of white flanked by two strips of burgundy. The jersey is burgundy and the pants gold.

The away uniform was white trimmed with red numbers and two red stripes on the arms.

Current Uniform
The Cardinals current home uniform is made up of three colours; the primary colour is burgundy. The second is gold which runs from the base of the pants up the outside of the legs and follows onto the jersey before moving under the arms to the top of the shoulder, and is also the colour of the shirt numbers. The final colour is white which outlines the jersey numbers. The pants are burgundy with gold trim and the socks are white.

The away uniform is largely the same as the home with the only difference being that the burgundy jersey is replaced with a white jersey with burgundy numbering outlined by gold.

Retired Numbers

At the end of the 2010 season Ralph Alexander, GM & Owner of the Ipswich Cardinals, made the decision to retire the club's first ever number. Head Coach Ian Girling has seen service with the organisation since its inception in 1985 first as a player in the Wide Receiver and Quarterback role, later as offensive coordinator and finally as the current Head Coach (As of 2010). In that time he has won 2 National titles and represented British American football in Europe. It was decided that a fitting way to recognise this outstanding commitment to the organisation was to retire his number from the team's roster. At the Cardinals' 25th anniversary party the GM presented the number 7 to Coach Girling and thanked him for all he has done to help make the team as strong as it is today.

Following the death of Defensive Lineman Christopher Butcher in October 2017 it was decided to retire his number 76 and a framed jersey was presented to his father, Terry Butcher.

Coaching staff and front office

References

External links
 Official website

 BAFACL

BAFA National League teams
American football teams in England
Sport in Ipswich
American football teams established in 1986
1986 establishments in England